The Missouri-Pacific Depot is a historic railroad station at South Denver Avenue and West C Street in Russellville, Arkansas.  It is a long rectangular single-story masonry building, finished in brick and stucco and covered by a hip roof with supporting Italianate brackets.  At one end, the roof extends beyond the structure to form a sheltered area, and the telegrapher's booth projects from the building's north (track-facing) side.  It was built about 1910 by the Missouri-Pacific Railroad, and is typical of that railroad's period stations; its original tile roof has been replaced by composition shingles.

The depot was listed on the National Register of Historic Places in 1992.

The statue placed in front of the depot, titled Mr. Conductor, has become a symbol of the thriving downtown market that has developed in recent years. He is posed, pocket watch in hand, calling any last passengers to hop aboard. Although his watch does not tell hours and minutes, it indeed shows the passing of time and once would have told many weary travelers where they would be headed next. Mr. Conductor has become a local personality, often photographed, decorated, and honored.

See also
National Register of Historic Places listings in Pope County, Arkansas

References

Railway stations on the National Register of Historic Places in Arkansas
National Register of Historic Places in Pope County, Arkansas
Railway stations in the United States opened in 1910
Buildings and structures in Russellville, Arkansas
Individually listed contributing properties to historic districts on the National Register in Arkansas
Russellville
1910 establishments in Arkansas
Former railway stations in Arkansas
Transportation in Pope County, Arkansas